Bijay Subedi is a member of provincial assembly in Bagmati Province of Nepal. He was elected from Chitwan 2(B) for the CPN(UML).

See also 

 Jagannath Paudel
 Renu Dahal

References 

Members of the Provincial Assembly of Bagmati Province 
Communist Party of Nepal (Unified Marxist–Leninist) politicians
Year of birth missing (living people)
Living people
People from Chitwan District